Social pattern may refer to a pattern of:
Social behavior
Social structure